"Wonderful" is a song by Annie Lennox, released as the third and last single from her album Bare in 2004. It was released as a CD single and 12 inch single in the United States and only as a promotional single elsewhere. The single topped the Billboard Hot Dance Club Play chart for a week and became her fifth number one on that chart.
No music video was made for this song.

Track listing

UK CD single

1. "Wonderful"  (Album Version) – 4:16  
2. "Pavement Cracks" (Goldtrix Full Vocal Mix) – 6:34 
3. "A Thousand Beautiful Things" (Gabriel & Dresden Tech Funk Mix) – 9:03

Critical reception
The song had mixed critical reception. Thom Jurek of AllMusic made the song a "Track Pick" off Bare, called it "one of Lennox's trademark ballads", and praised the song's lyrics and its "Hall & Oates-styled Philly soul refrain". Meanwhile, Rolling Stone's Anthony Decurtis wrote that "the thumping funk chorus of 'Wonderful,' for example, sounds forced" and called it a "misstep".

Remake
The song was covered by recording artist Lovari on his album Moment Of Love [6] , which reached #2 on iTunes Electronic Dance Chart in the United States. A music video [6] was released to accompany the track.

Chart performance

Weekly charts

Year-end charts

See also
 List of Billboard Hot Dance Club Play number ones of 2004

References

6. https://choiceradio.co.uk/lovari-wonderful/ Retrieved 15 May 2020

2004 singles
Songs written by Annie Lennox
2003 songs
J Records singles
Pop ballads
Soul ballads
Annie Lennox songs
2000s ballads